Syed Sahil Agha Born: 1984 (age 38 years) is a writer, author, and storyteller from New Delhi, India who specialized in the verbal art of dastangoi.

Storytelling background
Agha performs dastangoi,  a 13th-century Urdu art of oral storytelling.  His first dastangoi performance was in college. Agha gave his first professional dastangoi performance in 2010 at Jamia while he ran a business selling antique vehicles. He claims his grandfather was the inspiration for his work.

Agha's book, Dastan-e-Hind, a collection of his dastans (or tales) and Indian folklore, has inspired successful performances by many artists around the globe. Unlike most dastangos, Agha prefers to perform solo rather than as part of a pair.  His dastans include Vikram-Betal and Tughlaqnama, which have become a hit amongst his audiences.

He has also come up with a new idea of 'Musical Dastangoi' which have a amalgamated Dastangoi with Indian Opera and Indian classical music.

Work
Biographical
Dastan Mehbub e Elhai - Story of a Sufi saint Nizamuddin Auliya and 12th-century Delhi, India.
Dastan-e-Amir Khusro - Used storytelling and music to create a compelling product; music composed by Ustad Iqbal Ahmad Khan.
Dastan-e-Shoaib Akhtar -  entailing interesting details and anecdotes from Shoaib’s life in form of 'dastangoi' story. Shoaib is a Pakistani former cricketer and World fastest bowler.
Jashn e Javed Akhtar - Dastan-e- Javed Akhtar is about an Indian poet, lyricist, screenwriter and political activist. Known for his work in Hindi cinema, he has won five National Film Awards, and received the Padma Shri in 1999 and the Padma Bhushan in 2007, two of India's highest civilian honours.
Dastan e Chiragh - Biography of Nasiruddin Chiragh Dehlavi as a 14th-century mystic poet and Sufi saint from Delhi, India.
Dastan-e-Mahatma - A glimpse into Mahatma Gandhi’s life.
Dastan Agni Ki Udaan - A motivational story about a poor child who had nothing in his childhood but achieved the highest honor in his country, Bharat Ratna. A. P. J. Abdul Kalam,  an aerospace scientist who served as the 11th President of India.
Dastan e Mir - Biography of Meer Taqi Meer, an Urdu poet from 18th-century Mughal India, and one of the pioneers who gave shape to the Urdu language itself.
Dastan e Ghalib - Glorification of Mirza Ghalib, a prominent Urdu and Persian poet during the last years of the Mughal Empire.
Dastan e Daagh - Story of the colorful life of Daagh Dehlvi, a poet known for his Urdu ghazals. He belonged to the old Delhi school of Urdu poetry.
Dastan Shah e Awadh - The last Nawab of Awadh, Wajid Ali Shah, was a poet, playwright, dancer, and great patron of arts. He is widely credited for the revival of Kathak as a major form of classical Indian dance. He is survived by many descendants. (His Thumri - Babul Mora Naihar Chhooto Jaay has been sung by some singers at the end of a dastangoi).
 Dastan Sultan e Azam - Tiger of Mysore, Tipu Sultan was a ruler of the Kingdom of Mysore and a pioneer of rocket artillery. The story also touches on an ambitious economic development program that established Mysore as a major economic power, with some of the world's highest real wages and living standards in the late 18th century. The story also covered battles involving British forces such as the Anglo-Mysore Wars, Battle of Pollilur, and Siege of Seringapatam.
Dastan Dilli Ke Shayron ki - A story about Delhi's royal Urdu poets.

Crime
 Dastan Ek Raaz - A story within many stories, it's about metro cities' sex workers, their struggles and how they become victims of human trafficking.

Musical Storytelling
Dastan e Duvidha - Musical dastangoi; collaborated with opera singer Kabuki Khanna on a narration of Vijayadan Detha’s story Duvidha.
Jashn e Virasat - Musical Tales of Urdu Heritage and Hindu-Muslim unity with Rita Dav and opera singer Kabuki Khanna.
Dastan Ishq e Meera - Music and Kathak Dance narrative; Meera Bai was a 16th-century Hindu mystic poet and a devotee of Krishna. She is a celebrated Bhakti saint in the Indian Hindu tradition. She was a widely known and cherished figure in the Bhakti movement. The majority of the performance is about Meera's fearless disregard for social and family conventions.
Dastan e Sahir - The People's Poet; Abdul Hayee, popularly known by his pen name Sahir Ludhianvi, was a legendary 20th century Hindi and Urdu poet cum film lyricist who wasn't afraid to question society and its many ills. He was awarded the Padma Shri.
Dilli Durbar -  A Sufi Jugalbandi and a unique amalgamation of ghazal and dastangoi with Imran Khan.

Comedy
Mulla Dastango - An old storyteller, Mulla wrote stories that had subtle humour and a pedagogic nature.
 Dastan e Mulla Nasreddin - He is considered a Sufi and a wise man, remembered for his funny stories and anecdotes. He appears in thousands of stories, sometimes witty, sometimes wise, but often as a fool or the butt of a joke too.

Satire
Tughlaq Nama - Political satire about Indian politicians and an exposé of the strong and corrupt nexus between politicians, criminals, businessmen, and police.

Family Drama
Dastan e Zindagi -  An Indian political family drama.

Indian Mythology
Dastan Vikram Aur Betaal - The concept of the story was based on Baital Pachisi, a collection of tales about the legendary King Vikram (identified as Vikramāditya) and a Vetala.

Motivational
Dastan e Azmat - This performance is based on the true life of Saint Mother Teresa, Mother of the Nation - India.
She was born in Skopje, and then moved to Ireland and later to India, where she lived for most of her life. She devoted her life to chastity, poverty, and obedience, and also professed a fourth vow — to give "wholehearted free service to the poorest of the poor."

Historical Fiction
Dastan e Sultan Salahuddin - Saladin Ayyub was the first sultan of Egypt and Syria and the founder of the Ayyubid dynasty.
Dastan Raja Vikram Swachh Bharat Abhiyan
Dastan e Fath - This story is about Prince Abd al-Rahman I of Spain, Falcon of Andalus (Spain), how he founded a dynasty that ruled the greater part of Iberia for nearly three centuries (including the succeeding Caliphate of Córdoba).

Thriller
Dastan e Anna - A love story between a female English secret agent and Indian Sultan.

Love Story
Dastan e Ishq - The story is inspired by an Ameer Khusro's traditional folklore.

Fiction
Dastan Akhri Dastango - The last storyteller.

Historical
Dastan e Dard - The story of Karbala and the last imam.
Dastan e Taqseem - A painful journey; Partition of India, Pakistan, and Bangladesh.
Dastan e Dastangoi - Story of Indian storytelling art form dastangoi.
Dastan e Awadh - The story is about the glory and downfall of old Lucknow.
Dilli Durbar -  A Sufi Jugalbandi and a unique amalgamation of ghazal and dastangoi with Imran Khan.

Filmography

Television

Filmography

Awards and honours
 Pradesh Jouhar Award 2017
 Hafeez Merathi Award 2017 
 Delhi Minorities Commission Award 2019 
 National Museum, New Delhi honored Agha the 'Grace of Dastangoi' and displayed his dastangoi costume 'Angrakha' at Chitram Vastram 2022.

Vintage car collection
Agha, collecting vintage cars is a passion. In the past years, he has collected several high-end British and German cars.

References

External links
The Story of Mr. Gautam Bali, as told by Syed Sahil Agha, Delhi, 9 June 2017

1982 births
Living people
Indian writers
Jamia Millia Islamia alumni
Dastangos